Maurice Autora Morris (born December 1, 1979) is a former American football running back. He was drafted by the Seattle Seahawks in the second round of the 2002 NFL Draft and also played for the Detroit Lions. He played college football at Oregon.

Early life
Morris attended Chester High School in Chester, South Carolina. As a senior, he rushed for over 1,600 yards and 25 touchdowns. He holds several school records including:  Most Yards Gained (3,708); Most Carries (593); Most Touchdowns Scored: (45); Most Points Scored: (298); and All-Purpose Yards Gained: (4,487).

Morris began his college career at Fresno City College in 1998. He then went to the University of Oregon, where he became the starting running back and helped the team to a 2002 Fiesta Bowl victory. In the Fiesta Bowl, he ran for a highlight-reel 49-yard touchdown, during which he landed on top of a defender and got up without touching the ground.

Professional career

Seattle Seahawks
Morris was the Seattle Seahawks primary kickoff returner between 2002 and 2004. He was consistent though unspectacular and was supplanted by Josh Scobey for kick returning duties in 2005. Morris saw limited action behind Shaun Alexander, the 2005 MVP, though his contributions did not go unnoticed by teammates. Alexander told the Seattle Times on August 17, 2006 that Morris could start for at least ten different teams in the NFL and could produce a thousand rushing yards and eight or nine touchdowns if given the opportunity.

In the 2005 playoffs when the Seahawks played the Washington Redskins, Alexander went out with a concussion and Morris filled in capably, helping the Seahawks to victory.

During the 2006 season, Alexander was out for 6 games and Morris filled in. He finished the season with 604 rushing yards playing all 16 regular season games. His best season to date is the 2007 season where he finished with 628 rushing yards and 4 rushing touchdowns and 1 receiving touchdown. He played 14 games during the regular season.

When the Seahawks signed Julius Jones and released Shaun Alexander prior to the 2008 season, it appeared Morris would be the backup again. While Jones did get more carries on the season (158 to Morris' 132), Morris arguably contributed more effectively to the Seahawks' running game. Consequently, Morris replaced Jones as the Seahawks' feature back during the latter part of the season. In the final 6 weeks of the season, Morris had 93 carries compared to Jones' 19.

Detroit Lions
On February 27, 2009, Morris signed a three-year, $7 million deal with the Detroit Lions.

Personal life 
Morris is the cousin of New Orleans Saints linebacker D'Marco Jackson.

References

External links
 Maurice Morris Profile at ESPN.com

1979 births
Living people
African-American players of American football
American football running backs
People from Chester, South Carolina
Oregon Ducks football players
Seattle Seahawks players
Detroit Lions players
Players of American football from South Carolina
Fresno City Rams football players
21st-century African-American sportspeople
20th-century African-American sportspeople